Schüttler is a German surname. Notable people with the surname include:

Josef Schüttler (1902–1972), German politician
Katharina Schüttler (born 1979), German actress
Rainer Schüttler (born 1976), German tennis player

German-language surnames